Robert Walter may refer to:

 Robert Walter (physician) (1841–1921), Canadian American physician and natural hygiene proponent
 Robert Walter (politician) (born 1948), British Conservative Member of Parliament
 Robert Walter (musician) (born 1970), keyboard player
 Robert Walter (editor), editor and executive with not-for-profit organizations
 Robert D. Walter (born 1944), American businessman
 Robert M. Walter (1908–1981), Polish astrologer and homeopath

See also
 
Robert Walters (disambiguation)
Robert Walthour (1878–1949), American professional cyclist